Hirase (written: 平瀬) is a Japanese surname. Notable people with the surname include:

, Japanese professional golfer 
, Japanese botanist
, Japanese malacologist
, Japanese former footballer 
, Japanese malacologist

Japanese-language surnames